Kim Ji-soo may refer to: 

Kim Ji-soo (actor) (born 1993), known as Ji Soo, South Korean actor
Kim Ji-soo (actress) (born Yang Sung-yoon in 1972), South Korean actress
Kim Ji-soo (singer, born 1990), South Korean male singer
Kim Ji-soo (singer, born 1995), South Korean idol and member of Blackpink
Kim Ji-soo (baseball) (born 1986), South Korean baseball player
Kim Ji-soo (skeleton racer) (born 1994), South Korean skeleton racer
Kim Ji-su (judoka) (born 2000), South Korean judoka
Kim Ji-soo (footballer) (born 2004), South Korean footballer